Boris Kirillov (born 4 August 1992) is an Azerbaijani swimmer. He competed in the men's 200 metre backstroke event at the 2016 Summer Olympics.

References

External links
 

1992 births
Living people
Azerbaijani male swimmers
Olympic swimmers of Azerbaijan
Swimmers at the 2016 Summer Olympics
Place of birth missing (living people)
Male backstroke swimmers